Regent's Park, Regents Park or Regent Park can mean:

Regent's Park
Regent's Park, a park in London, England
Regent's Park tube station, a London Underground station
Regent's Park Estate, a housing estate east of Regent's Park
Regent's Park Barracks, British Army barracks in Albany Street
Regent's University London, a private non-profit university in Regent's Park
Regent's Business School London part of Regent's College
Regent's Park College, Oxford, a permanent private hall of the University of Oxford, England
Regent's Park (Camden ward), an electoral ward in the London Borough of Camden
 Regent's Park, a neighbourhood of Glasgow, Scotland

Regents Park
Regents Park (Chicago), an apartment complex in Chicago, United States
Regents Park, Gauteng, a suburb of Johannesburg, South Africa
Regents Park, Southampton, a suburb of Southampton, England
Regents Park, New South Wales, a suburb of Sydney, Australia
Regents Park, Queensland, a suburb of Logan City, Australia

Regent Park
Regent Park, a neighbourhood in Toronto, Canada
Regent Park-Carolinas, a neighborhood and golf course community in Fort Mill, South Carolina 
Regent Park, Kolkata, a neighbourhood in Kolkata, India